Etsako Central is a Local Government Area at Edo State, Nigeria. Its headquarters is in the town of Fugar.

It has an area of 660 km and a population of 94,575 in the 2006 census. The Common language speaking in the area is Afemai language while Islam and Christianity are mostly practice by majority of the people. The local government area is located in the Northern part of Edo State.

The postal code of the area is 312.

Towns /Villages and Zip codes

Economy Estako Central 
About 60% of the population of Estako Central local government area are farmers, hunters and fishermen. The types of crops grown in the area are yam, cassava, and maize. Other important commercial activities in the area are wood carving, blacksmith, and small scale business during weekly markets day for buying and selling.

References

Local Government Areas in Edo State